Frederic Chatfield Smith (11 June 1823 – 20 April 1905) was head of Smith's Bank in Nottingham and a British Conservative Party politician.

Smith was the son of Samuel George Smith (1789-1863), of Goldings, Hertfordshire and his wife Eugenia Chatfield (1803-1838).

Smith entered the House of Commons as Member of Parliament (MP) for Nottinghamshire North when he was elected unopposed at the 1868 general election.  He was re-elected unopposed in 1874, and stood down at the 1880.

Frederic Chatfield Smith bought "Bramcote Hall" in Bramcote (Nottinghamshire) from Mr. Wilmot as home for his family and enlarged it considerably. Built in the early part of the nineteenth century, it was demolished in 1966.

References

External links 
 

1823 births
1905 deaths
Conservative Party (UK) MPs for English constituencies
UK MPs 1868–1874
UK MPs 1874–1880
Frederick
People from East Hertfordshire District
People from Bramcote